Mohamed Ali Hasan Ali is a Bahraini politician who is currently a Member of the Consultative Council.

He was educated at the University of Bahrain (BSc Chemistry and Physics, 1983) and the University of East Anglia (MSc Chemical and Environmental Sciences, 1987; PhD, 1994).

References

Year of birth missing (living people)
Living people
University of Bahrain alumni
Alumni of the University of East Anglia
Members of the Consultative Council (Bahrain)
Bahraini politicians